Hatsikavan is a village in the Akhuryan Municipality of the Shirak Province of Armenia. It located 2 km northwest from Hatsik village.

Demographics
The population of the village since 1926 is as follows:

References 

Populated places in Shirak Province